The 1895 ICA Track Cycling World Championships were the World Championship for track cycling. They took place in Cologne, Germany from 17 to 19 August 1895. Four events for men were contested, two for professionals and two for amateurs.

Medal summary

Medal table

References

Track cycling
UCI Track Cycling World Championships by year
Sports competitions in Cologne
1895 in track cycling
International cycle races hosted by Germany
August 1895 sports events
1890s in Prussia
19th century in Cologne